Mona-Liisa Nousiainen (née Malvalehto; 20 July 1983 – 29 July 2019) was a Finnish cross-country skier who competed in the World Cup between 2002 and 2018.
Her best World Cup finish was first place in a sprint event in Liberec Czech Republic on 12 January 2013.

Malvalehto's best finish at the FIS Nordic World Ski Championships was seventh in the sprint event at Oberstdorf in 2005.

In 1999, she won the Finnish Championship in accordion playing. She studied at the Sibelius Academy.

She announced her retirement from cross-country skiing after not being selected for the 2018 Winter Olympics.

Mona-Liisa Nousiainen was married to Ville Nousiainen since 2015, with whom she had one daughter. She was a friend of Swedish cross-country skier Charlotte Kalla.

Nousiainen died of stomach cancer on 29 July 2019 at the age of 36. She is buried in Valkeala cemetery in Kouvola.

Cross-country skiing results
All results are sourced from the International Ski Federation (FIS).

Olympic Games

World Championships

World Cup

Season standings

Individual podiums
1 victory

Team podiums
1 victory – (1 ) 
2 podiums – (2 )

References

External links

1983 births
2019 deaths
People from Rovaniemi
Finnish female cross-country skiers
Cross-country skiers at the 2014 Winter Olympics
Olympic cross-country skiers of Finland
Deaths from stomach cancer
Deaths from cancer in Finland
Sportspeople from Lapland (Finland)
20th-century Finnish women